The 2008–09 The Citadel Bulldogs basketball team represented The Citadel, The Military College of South Carolina in the 2008-09 NCAA Division I men's basketball season. The Bulldogs were led by third year head coach Ed Conroy and played their home games at McAlister Field House. They played as members of the Southern Conference, as they have since 1936.

The Bulldogs won 20 games for just the second time in school history, and finished tied with archrival College of Charleston for second in the SoCon South Division.  They also made their first postseason appearance, earning an invitation to the 2009 CollegeInsider.com Postseason Tournament, where they were eliminated in the first round by eventual champion Old Dominion.

Schedule

|-
! colspan=8 style=""|Exhibition

|-
! colspan=8 style=""|Regular Season

|-
! colspan=8 style=""|

|-
! colspan=8 style=""|

References

The Citadel Bulldogs basketball seasons
Citadel
Citadel
Citadel Bulldogs bask
Citadel Bulldogs bask